The Yachats State Recreation Area is a state park in southern Lincoln County, Oregon, in the central district of the town of Yachats.  It is administered by the Oregon Parks and Recreation Department.  It is located on the Pacific Ocean coast, on the north side of the mouth of the Yachats River.  The park is open for day use only, and offers wildlife and surf viewing, tidepools, fishing, and picnicking.

See also
 List of Oregon State Parks
 Yachats Ocean Road State Natural Site

References

External links
 

State parks of Oregon
Oregon Coast
Parks in Lincoln County, Oregon
IUCN Category V